The Ali abad District is situated in the southern part of Kunduz Province, Afghanistan. It borders the Baghlan Province to the south, Chahar dara District to the west, Kunduz and Khan Abad districts to the north and Takhar Province to the east.

The population was 41,700 in 2006, consisting of these ethnic groups:
30% Pashtuns
30% Uzbeks
20% Tajiks
20% Hazaras

54,207||  || 47% Pashtuns, 33% Tajik, 12% Hazara, 8% Uzbek 

The district center is 'Aliabad, located in the central part of the district on the road between Kunduz and Baghlan. The district is generally poor and seriously affected by the drought. The German reconstruction team is working on a new dam.

References

External links
District Profile

Districts of Kunduz Province